Free run or Free Run may refer to:
 Free run (farming stewardship), a method of farming stewardship where the animals are not kept in cages but are allowed to wander around inside an enclosed structure, such as a barn
 Free run (oenology), a method to gather the must from grapes without pressing
 "Free Run", a 2012 song by Chris Brown from Fortune

See also 
 Free running (disambiguation)
 Freerunner (disambiguation)